"Weep, o mine eyes" is one of the most famous madrigals of the English composer John Bennet. It is written for four vocal parts and was first published in his first collection, Madrigalls to Fovre Voyces, in 1599. The composition is an homage to John Dowland, being based partly on Dowland's most famous piece, "Flow, my tears".

References

External links
 
 
 , Cambridge Singers

English madrigals
1590s compositions
1599 works